Lathi khela is a traditional Bengali martial art – a kind of stick fighting practised India and Bangladesh. A practitioner is known as a lathial.

Etymology
The word lathi is the Bengali word meaning stick, while khela means a sport or game. Therefore, lathi khela translates as a game of sticks.

Instruments
The lathi is normally made of the male bamboo and sometimes bound at short intervals with iron rings. A typical lathi measures 6 to 8 feet (2 to 2.4 m). Some, called bari, are shorter and may be wielded like a baton or bludgeon. In the past, sticks could be paired with shields, as can still be seen in nori bari (mock stick-fight) demonstrations.

History
Stick fighting has an ancient history in South Asia, tracing back to the region's aboriginal inhabitants. Rich farmers and other eminent people hired lathial for security and as a symbol of their power. Duels were used as a way to protect or take land and other possessions. A proverb in some South Asian languages is "whoever wields the lathi keeps the buffalo". Zamindars (feudal lords) sent groups of lathial to forcefully collect taxes from villagers. Lathi training was at one time included in the Bratachari system of education.

Although lathi is practised in Indian and Bangladeshi villages, urbanization has led to its decline as a rural martial art in recent decades. Until 1989, an annual nationwide lathi khela convention was held in Kushtia, Bangladesh, where troupes from all over the country took part. Due to the drop in practitioners and spectators, the convention is now held once every three years. Even in the districts where lathi troupes once flourished, only several now remain. Today, lathi khela is most often seen during festivals and weddings. Matches are held in West Bengal for certain puja rituals, and a similar sport called chamdi is played during Eid in North Bengal.

Practice
Lathial group performed acts like Baoi Jhak (group fight), Nori Bari (mock fight with sticks), Fala Khela and Dao Khela (mock fight with sharp weapons) and Chhuri dance to music, in the presence of hundreds. These groups may learn the arts of dao khela (machete fighting) and fara khela (sword fighting), both of which are preserved today in the form of mock-fights. Matches are generally one-on-one, but the art includes mock-group fights or baoi jhak. In lathi the centre of energy is the heart chakra, and practitioners fight in a more upright position.

Present day
The popularity of lathi khela is waning. Practice of this art form throughout the country can increase its popularity and ensure its continued existence.

See also

 Boli Khela

References

External links
 Traditional Bengali martial arts Lathi Khela is performed
 ‘Lathi khela’ at Charukala
 Lathi Khela to celebrate Tangail Free Day
 Two-day long traditional Lathi Khela ended in Kushtia

Bangladeshi martial arts
Combat sports
South Asian martial arts
Sport in Bangladesh
Stick-fighting
Sport in India
Traditional sports of Bangladesh